Partick Central railway station was a station serving the Partick area of the city of Glasgow.  Built in the 1890s by the Lanarkshire and Dunbartonshire Railway Company, it sat on a line that ran along the north bank of the River Clyde from Stobcross to Dumbarton.

History 

The station was renamed Kelvin Hall in 1959, as it was in the vicinity of the building of that name, and was close, but not attached to, the Partick Cross station on the Glasgow Subway.

Passenger and goods services to the station ceased in 1964 when it closed as part of the Beeching cuts to rail services across the UK. The station building was later used as a workshop and an auction house before lying empty for a number of years. The remains of the platforms and trackbed, which were underneath the station building, have been removed but the railway's route is fairly discernible. The station's goods yard served as a site for travelling people and as a scrap merchants.

Redevelopment of site 
The site had been empty and awaiting redevelopment when in 2004 it emerged that the supermarket chain Tesco wished to develop a 24-hour operation there, in the face of local opposition. Tesco had the station building demolished on 28 January 2007, before planning permission had been given for the development from Glasgow City Council.

References

Notes

Sources 
 
 
 
 Partick Central station on navigable OS map
 The Disused Partick Central Station

Disused railway stations in Glasgow
Former Caledonian Railway stations
Railway stations in Great Britain opened in 1896
Railway stations in Great Britain closed in 1964
Beeching closures in Scotland
Partick